Jim Thomas (born September 24, 1974) is an American former professional tennis player.  His highest ATP world singles ranking was number 288, which he reached on November 2, 1998. His career high in doubles was at 29, set on August 21, 2006. He retired following the 2008 season.

Biography
Thomas began playing tennis at age three and is the youngest of six children (four brothers, one sister). He has 16 nephews and nieces and considers his parents most inspirational people in his life. His father is a doctor and his mother is a teacher.

Favourite players he enjoyed watching while growing up were John McEnroe and Boris Becker. Jim played four years at Stanford University from 1992 to 1996 and earned a degree in American Studies before turning pro. He also earned All-American honours during his senior year and was a member of NCAA team champions in 1995–96.

Thomas is interested in national and international politics.  He is involved with Victory Gallop in Bath, Ohio, an equestrian therapy organisation for at-risk children.  He considers hard courts to be his favourite surface.

Thomas's career best effort at a Grand Slam was the 2005 US Open where he and Paul Goldstein made the semi-finals. He has 6 doubles ATP titles and 14 doubles Challenger titles to his name. He recorded doubles wins over Rafael Nadal, Roger Federer, Novak Djokovic, Andy Murray, Lleyton Hewitt, Marat Safin, the Bryan brothers and Pat Rafter amongst others, in his career.

ATP career finals

Doubles:13 (6–7)

External links
 
 
 Official Jim Thomas Website: http://jimthomas11.tripod.com

1974 births
Living people
American male tennis players
Sportspeople from Canton, Ohio
Stanford Cardinal men's tennis players
Tennis people from Ohio